Ratledge is an Anglo-Scottish surname. Notable people with the surname include:

 Mike Ratledge (born 1943), British musician
 Miles Ratledge (born 1967), founding member of the band Napalm Death

See also
Routledge (surname)
Rutledge (disambiguation)

References